The Texas Miss Basketball honor recognizes the top high school basketball player in the state of Texas. The award is presented annually by the Texas Association of Basketball Coaches.

Award winners

Schools with multiple winners

See also
Texas Mr. Basketball

References

Mr. and Miss Basketball awards
High school sports in Texas
Awards established in 1984
1984 establishments in Texas
Women's sports in Texas
Basketball in Texas
Lists of people from Texas
Lists of American sportswomen
American women's basketball players
Miss Basketball